Eohippus is an extinct genus of small equid ungulates. The only species is E. angustidens, which was long considered a species of Hyracotherium. Its remains have been identified in North America and date to the Early Eocene (Ypresian stage).

Discovery
 
Its similarities with fossils described by Richard Owen were formally pointed out in a 1932 paper by Clive Forster Cooper. E. validus was moved to the genus Hyracotherium, which had priority as the name for the genus, with Eohippus becoming a junior synonym of that genus. Hyracotherium was recently found to be a paraphyletic group of species, and the genus now includes only H. leporinum. E. validus was found to be identical to an earlier-named species, Orohippus angustidens Cope, 1875, and the resulting binomial is thus Eohippus angustidens.

Description 
Eohippus stands at about 30 cm (12 in), or 3 hands tall. It has 4 toes on its front feet and 3 toes on the hinds, each toe ending in a hoof. Its incisors, molars and premolars resemble modern Equus. However, a differentiating trait of Eohippus is its large canine teeth.

Stephen Jay Gould comments
In his 1991 essay, "The Case of the Creeping Fox Terrier Clone", Stephen Jay Gould lamented the prevalence of a much-repeated phrase to indicate Eohippus size ("the size of a small Fox Terrier"), even though most readers would be quite unfamiliar with that breed of dog. He concluded that the phrase had its origin in a widely-distributed pamphlet by Henry Fairfield Osborn, and proposed that Osborn, a keen fox hunter, could have made a natural association between his horses and the dogs that accompanied them.

See also
Mesohippus
Protohippus

References

Eocene horses
Eocene odd-toed ungulates
Eocene mammals of North America
Prehistoric placental genera